Halumatha is a denomination of the Hindu religion mainly followed by Hatkar and Kuruba Gowda. The majority of members of Halumatha are followers of Advaita and Nature Worship.

Definition
Halumatha or Palamatha means beliefs of the  protectors of the society. In Sanskrit Pal means protect, defend, rule, govern etc. Matha means group view, belief, doctrine etc.

Culture
Worshiping originated from Halumatha. Stone is the source for the soil. Soil is the source for the plants. Plants are the source for the animals. This may be the reason for worshiping Almight in Stone. Through the ages, this stone worship tradition might have led to worshiping Shiva as Beeralingeswara, Mailara Linga, Malladevaru, Mahadeshwara, Nanjundeswara, Mallappa, Mallara, Mallikarjuna etc. Even the worshiping of shakti as Yellamma, Renuka,  Chowdamma, Kariyamma, Chamundi, Bhanashankari, Gullamma etc. might have come from this tradition. Even today, ancestral worship as deities is very common. The worship of ancestors like Revanasidda, Rama, Hanuman, Krishna, Keshava, Ranganatha, Eerathimmanna,  Tirupati Thimmappa, Venkateswara, Kalidasa, Siddarama, Kanakadasa etc. as Devaru very much exists in Kuruba Gowda traditions. Kurubas worship Shiva and Vishnu concept of the Almighty with the equal devotion.

See also
 Halumatha Kuruba Purana
 Dhangar

References and external Links
halumatha pethà
 Siva and Vishnu are One and the Same.

Hindu denominations